Tropomyosin alpha-1 chain is a protein that in humans is encoded by the TPM1 gene. This gene is a member of the tropomyosin (Tm) family of highly conserved, widely distributed actin-binding proteins involved in the contractile system of striated and smooth muscles and the cytoskeleton of non-muscle cells.

Structure
Tm is a 32.7 kDa protein composed of 284 amino acids. Tm is a flexible protein homodimer or heterodimer composed of two alpha-helical chains, which adopt a bent coiled coil conformation to wrap around the seven actin molecules in a functional unit of muscle. It is polymerized end to end along the two grooves of actin filaments and provides stability to the filaments.  Human striated muscles express protein from the TPM1 (α-Tm), TPM2 (β-Tm) and TPM3 (γ-Tm) genes, with α-Tm being the predominant isoform in striated muscle. In human cardiac muscle the ratio of α-Tm to β-Tm is roughly 5:1.

Function
Tm functions in association with the troponin complex to regulate the calcium-dependent interaction of actin and myosin during muscle contraction. Tm molecules are arranged head-to-tail along the actin thin filament, and are a key component in cooperative activation of muscle. A three state model has been proposed by McKillop and Geeves, which describes the positions of Tm during a cardiac cycle. The blocked (B) state occurs in diastole when intracellular calcium is low and Tm blocks the myosin binding site on actin. The closed (C) state is when Tm is positioned on the inner groove of actin; in this state myosin is in a "cocked" position where heads are weakly bound and not generating force. The myosin binding (M) state is when Tm is further displaced from actin by myosin crossbridges that are strongly-bound and actively generating force. In addition to actin, Tm binds troponin T (TnT). TnT tethers the region of head-to-tail overlap of subsequent Tm molecules to actin.

Clinical Significance
Mutations in TPM1 have been associated with hypertrophic cardiomyopathy (HCM), dilated cardiomyopathy and left ventricular noncompaction cardiomyopathy (LVNC). HCM mutations tend to cluster around the N-terminal region and a primary actin binding region known as period 5.

References

Further reading

External links 
 Mass spectrometry characterization of human TPM1 at COPaKB 
  GeneReviews/NIH/NCBI/UW entry on Familial Hypertrophic Cardiomyopathy Overview